James Harten (11 November 1924 – 11 September 2001) was an Australian cricketer. He played in two first-class match for Queensland in 1949/50.

See also
 List of Queensland first-class cricketers

References

External links
 

1924 births
2001 deaths
Australian cricketers
Queensland cricketers
Cricketers from Brisbane